The Seremban–Bandar Baru Enstek Highway or Jalan Sungai Ujong, Federal Route 195, is a major highway in Negeri Sembilan, Malaysia which connects Seremban to Bandar Enstek. It is also a main route to the North–South Expressway Southern Route via Seremban Interchange.

The Kilometre Zero is located at Bukit Nenas Toxic Waste Disposal Facilities.

In 2012, the stretch of the highway from Seremban 2 to Bandar Sri Sendayan was upgraded into dual-carriageway. It was completed in 2014.

There is a pipeline crossing tunnel near Seremban 2.

At most sections, the Federal Route 195 was built under the JKR R5 road standard, allowing maximum speed limit of up to 90 km/h.

List of junctions

References

Highways in Malaysia
Malaysian Federal Roads
Transport in Negeri Sembilan